Pierias (Greek: Πιερίας) may refer to:

Dylan Pierias (born 2000), Australian association football defender
Enosi Pontion Pierias, a music festival in Greece

See also
Pieria (disambiguation)
Pieres